Comadia subterminata is a moth in the family Cossidae first described by William Barnes and Foster Hendrickson Benjamin in 1923. It is found in North America, where it has been recorded from Arizona, Utah, Colorado and New Mexico.

The wingspan is 13–18 mm for males and 19–21 mm for females. The forewings are fuscous gray, the costa with dark brown checks. The hindwings are light fuscous. Adults have been recorded on wing from May to July.

References

Cossinae
Moths described in 1923
Moths of North America